Pierre Jean Hyacinthe Adonis (or Antoine) Galoppe d'Onquaire (16 April 1805 – 9 January 1867) was a French writer and playwright.

Career
He was born in Montdidier, the son of Louis-Joseph Hyacinthe Galoppe-Donquaire, a merchant draper. After a brief spell as a military officer, he became a writer, under the nickname his father had given him of "Cléon" Galoppe d'Onquaire. He also wrote poetry and articles in Mémoires de l'Académie de la Somme. He died in Le Vésinet.

Among his operetta librettos, Jean-Baptiste Weckerlin's setting of La Laitière de Trianon, a salon opera in 1 act, is the best remembered, along with one song, "Ça fait peur aux oiseaux" from the operetta Bredouille, set to music by Paul Bernard (composer).

Works

Poetry, as Cléon Galoppe d'Onquaire, or "Pétrus Noël"
 Fumée, 1838
 Feuilles volantes, 1839
 Le Whist, "poème didactique en 4 chants", 1841
 Mosaïque, 1842
 Le Siège de la Sorbonne, ou le Triomphe de l'Université, "Poème héroï-comique en six chants", 1844

Comedies
 Une Femme de quarante ans, verse comedy in 3 acts; Théâtre-français, 20 November 1844
 Jean de Bourgogne, verse drama in 3 acts, with Pitre-Chevalier; Théâtre-français, 7 February 1846
 Les Trois roses, 1849
 Les Vendeurs du Temple, "satire réactionnaire", 1849
 Le Château de Coetaven, sung comedy in 1 act, with Achille d'Artois and Charles de Besselièvre; Paris, Variétés, 24 March 1852
 Le Chêne et le roseau, "comédie-vaudeville", with A. Decourcelle; Paris, Théâtre Vaudeville, 21 November 1852
 L'Amour pris aux cheveux, "pochade" in 1 act; Paris, Palais-Royal, 6 November 1852
 Les Vertueux de province, comedy in 3 acts; Paris, Odéon, 3 October 1860
 Le Capitaine Roche, operetta in 1 act to music by Georges Pfeiffer, 1862
 Bredouille, operetta in 1 act to music by Paul Bernard, 1864 (unperformed?)
 La Mort de Socrate, comic opera in 1 act, 1864 (unperformed?)
 La Bourse ou la vie, comic opera, 1865 (unperformed?)
 L'Eau de jouvence, comedy in 1 act, 1865 (unperformed?)
 La Laitière de Trianon, opera in 1 act to music by Jean-Baptiste Weckerlin (unperformed?)

Other
 Les Fêtes de l'église romaine, avec l'explication de l'origine de chaque solennité (1854)
 Le Livre des sacrements, avec notice historique et poème sur chaque sujet (Paris: C. Maillet-Schmitz, 1857)
 Le Diable boiteux à Paris (Paris: Librairie nouvelle, 1858)
 Le Diable boiteux en province (Paris: Librairie nouvelle, 1858)
 Le Diable boiteux au village (Paris: A. Bourdilliat, 1860)
 Le Diable boiteux au château (Paris: Michel Lévy, 1863)
 Hommes et bêtes, physiologies anthropozoologiques mais amusantes (Paris: Amyot, 1862)

1867 deaths
1805 births
19th-century French dramatists and playwrights
French opera librettists
People from Montdidier, Somme